Aminopyrimidine aminohydrolase (thiaminase, thiaminase II, tenA (gene)) is an enzyme with systematic name 4-amino-5-aminomethyl-2-methylpyrimidine aminohydrolase. This enzyme catalyses the following chemical reaction

 (1) 4-amino-5-aminomethyl-2-methylpyrimidine + H2O  4-amino-5-hydroxymethyl-2-methylpyrimidine + ammonia
 (2) thiamine + H2O  4-amino-5-hydroxymethyl-2-methylpyrimidine + 5-(2-hydroxyethyl)-4-methylthiazole

This enzyme was previously known as thiaminase II.

References

External links 
 

EC 3.5.99